The Paroi–Senawang–KLIA Expressway (PSKE) is a proposed expressway in Negeri Sembilan and Selangor state, Malaysia. It will link up Paroi, Senawang and Kuala Lumpur International Airport (KLIA). The  expressway will be built to reduced traffic jam along the North–South Expressway Southern Route E2 from Senawang to Nilai North.Completion date from Sendayan to KLIA will be more earlier at end of 2018

Route background
The interchanges will be at Paroi, Senawang, Rasah Jaya, Mambau South, Bukit Nenas, Sepang to KLIA (South).

History

Feature

List of Interchanges (Planned)

References

 

Expressways in Malaysia
Kuala Lumpur International Airport
Roads in Selangor
Transport in Negeri Sembilan